Benjamin Cameron Franklin (born 1972/1973) is an Australian politician. He served as a member of the New South Wales Legislative Council from March 2015 until March 2019, representing the National Party. He resigned in 2019 to contest the Legislative Assembly seat of Ballina, but was defeated by the incumbent Greens MP Tamara Smith. He was subsequently appointed in May 2019 to fill the casual vacancy caused by his own resignation. Franklin has served as the Minister for Aboriginal Affairs, the Minister for the Arts, and the Minister for Regional Youth in the Perrottet ministry since December 2021. 

Prior to his election, Franklin served as the State Director of the Nationals between 2008 and 2015.

Early life
Franklin's great, great uncle was Banjo Paterson.

Franklin studied a BA at the University of Sydney and resided at St Paul's College during his studies.

He is a former member of the Liberal Party and President of the NSW Young Liberals (2001-2002).

Career 
Franklin was the Communications Director for UNICEF Australia before being appointed State Director of the Nationals in 2008, where he served until his election to the NSW Legislative Council in March 2015. He currently lives in Byron Bay.

In January 2017, Franklin was appointed Parliamentary Secretary for Renewable Energy and Northern NSW. In December 2021, Franklin was appointed as the Minister for Aboriginal Affairs, the Minister for the Arts, and the Minister for Regional Youth. Following Stuart Ayres' resignation, Franklin assumed the portfolio of Minister for Tourism.

References

 

1970s births
Living people
Members of the New South Wales Legislative Council
National Party of Australia members of the Parliament of New South Wales
People educated at Cranbrook School, Sydney
21st-century Australian politicians